John McEnroe was the defending champion but lost in the quarterfinals to Joakim Nyström.

Ivan Lendl won in the final 7–6, 6–4, 6–1 against Tim Mayotte.

Seeds
A champion seed is indicated in bold text while text in italics indicates the round in which that seed was eliminated.

Draw

References
1985 Buick WCT Finals Draw (Archived 2009-05-07)

Singles